Tone Anne Alvestad Seland is a Norwegian handball player. She played twelve matches for the national handball team from 1989 to 1990, and participated at the 1990 World Women's Handball Championship, where the Norwegian team placed sixth.

References

External links

Year of birth missing (living people)
Living people
Norwegian female handball players